Mickey's Northwest Mounted is a 1929 silent short film in Larry Darmour's Mickey McGuire series starring a young Mickey Rooney. Directed by Albert Herman, the two-reel short was released to theaters on June 9, 1929 by FBO.

Plot
Stinkie Davis invites Mickey and the Scorpions to his rodeo. His invitation is actually a ploy to prank McGuire and his pals. However, things don't exactly go as planned for Stinkie. The kids partake in various picnic games, and Hambone gets into a headbutting contest with a goat.

Notes
An edited version of this film appeared on the Those Lovable Scallawags With Their Gangs television series.

Cast
Mickey Rooney - Mickey McGuire
Jimmy Robinson - Hambone Johnson
Delia Bogard - Tomboy Taylor
Marvin Stephens - Katrink
Buddy Brown - Stinkie Davis
Kendall McComas - Master of ceremonies

External links 
 

1929 films
1929 comedy films
American black-and-white films
American silent short films
Mickey McGuire short film series
Royal Canadian Mounted Police in fiction
1929 short films
Silent American comedy films
American comedy short films
1920s American films
1920s English-language films